Ana María Rivera (born 23 October 1993) is a Bolivian futsal player and a footballer who plays as a forward for the Bolivia women's national team.

Early life
Rivera hails from the Tarija Department.

Club career

San Martín de Porres
Rivera won the Bolivian football championship in 2016.

International career
Rivera represented Bolivia at the 2013 Bolivarian Games. At senior level, she played two Copa América Femenina editions (2014 and 2018).

As a futsal player, Rivera won the bronze medal with Bolivia at the 2018 South American Games.

References

1993 births
Living people
Women's association football forwards
Women's association football midfielders
Bolivian women's footballers
People from Tarija Department
Bolivia women's international footballers
Bolivian women's futsal players
South American Games bronze medalists for Bolivia
Competitors at the 2018 South American Games